The Mental Health Act 1959 was an act of the Parliament of the United Kingdom concerning England and Wales which had, as its main objectives, to abolish the distinction between psychiatric hospitals and other types of hospitals and to deinstituitionalise mental health patients and see them treated more by community care.

It also defined the term mental disorder for the first time: "mental illness as distinct from learning disability. The definition was “mental illness; arrest or incomplete development of mind; psychopathic disorder; and any other disorder or disability of mind”.

At the time, 0.4% of the population of England were housed in asylums, receiving the standard treatments of the time. Their treatment was considered by the 1957 Percy Commission and the act resulted from its deliberations. The act was designed to make:
 treatment voluntary and informal;
 and where compulsory give it a proper legal framework and made as a medical decision;
 and to move treatment, where possible, away from institutional care to that in the community.

The Act repealed the Lunacy and Mental Treatment Acts 1890 to 1930 and the Mental Deficiency Acts 1913 to 1938.

One of the changes introduced by the Act was the abolishment of the category of "moral imbecile". The category, which had been introduced in the 1913 Act, had been defined in such vague terms that it had allowed mothers of illegitimate children, especially in case of repeated births out of wedlock, to be regarded as "moral imbeciles" and thus to be placed in an institution for defectives or to be placed under guardianship.

The 1959 version was repealed after the Mental Health Act of 1983 was approved.

See also
Mental Health Act 1983

References

United Kingdom Acts of Parliament 1959
Acts of the Parliament of the United Kingdom concerning England and Wales
Legal history of England
Mental health legal history of the United Kingdom